Jon Paris is a Canadian computer scientist, author, and speaker recognized as one of the top experts on the IBM i platform. In 1987, Jon, then an experienced consultant, was hired by IBM to develop COBOL compilers for the System/36 and System/38 minicomputers. From there, he transitioned into the RPG group, where he played a pivotal role in the development of the modern RPG language as well as other language and development tools, including CODE/400 and Visual Age for RPG. He has also been instrumental in the porting of Python, Ruby, and other languages to the IBM i platform, as well as being a leader in pushing the adoption of completely free RPG. He is also an advocate for PHP on i.

Personal life
Paris is married to Susan Gantner.

Awards
In 2011, Paris was named Power Systems Champion.

References

External links
Website

Living people
American computer scientists
Year of birth missing (living people)